is a 1993 science fiction novel written by Yasutaka Tsutsui. It first appeared in Marie Claire magazine in four parts, each appearing chronologically in the January 1991, March 1992, August 1992, and June 1993 issues. A manga adaption of the novel was created by Reiji Hagiwara in 1995 but was not published until 2003. The novel was adapted as an animated film in 2006, which was itself adapted into a second manga the following year by Eri Sakai. The novel was translated into English by Andrew Driver, was published by Alma Books in April 2009.

Story
Dream monitoring and intervention as a means of treating mental disorders is a developing new form of psychotherapy in the near future. Brilliant psychiatry research establishment employee  is the most prominent scientist in this field, using her alter-ego  to infiltrate the dreams of others and treat their illnesses. Unrest ensues when the new psychotherapy device is stolen, allowing the assailant to enter the mind of anyone and enact mind control. The frantic search for the criminal and the DC Mini has begun.

Characters
Atsuko Chiba/Paprika – a beautiful but modest psychotherapist and lead researcher at the Institute of Psychiatric Research. When treating her patients she assumes her alter-ego, Paprika.
Kōsaku Tokita – a brilliant and overweight colleague and friend of Chiba, with whom she is in love. He is the inventor of the DC Mini.
Toratarō Shima – an administrator to the Institute who asks Chiba to bring out Paprika to help Noda's anxiety.
Morio Osanai – a handsome but deeply amoral co-worker of Chiba, who harbors both jealousy and love for her.
Tatsuo Noda – a prominent car company executive and an old friend of Shima who suffers from anxiety.

Adaptions

Animated film

An animated film adaption of the novel, directed by Satoshi Kon, was released in 2006, with Yasutaka Tsutsui himself providing the voice of a bartender.

Manga versions
Reiji Hagiwara's version in Kodansha's Mister Magazine (from October 1994 to September 1995)
Eri Sakai's version in Kodansha's Monthly Shōnen Sirius (from May to July 2007)

Live-action film

Wolfgang Petersen has the rights for a remake of Paprika.

Live-action television series
Cathy Yan will executive produce and direct a live-action television series adaptation of the novel for Amazon Studios and Hivemind.

References

1993 Japanese novels
Japanese novels adapted into films
Japanese science fiction novels
Japanese serial novels
Science fiction comics
Novels by Yasutaka Tsutsui
Chuokoron-Shinsha books
Fiction about mind control
Novels about dreams
Novels about mental health
Shōnen manga
Seinen manga